Nurul Islam, which also may be written Nur ul-Islam, is an Arabic phrase meaning light of Islam. It may refer to

 A. K. M. Nurul Islam (1919–2015), Bangladeshi politician, justice and vice-president of Bangladesh
 Mohammad Nurul Islam (1924–2007), Bangladeshi economist, Governor of Bangladesh Bank
 Mustafa Nurul Islam (1927–2018), Bangladeshi academician and National Professor of Bangladesh
 Nurul Islam (broadcaster) (1928–2006), Bangladeshi broadcast journalist, producer, and presenter at BBC
 AKM Nurul Islam (botanist) (1928–2006), Bangladeshi botanist and National Professor of Bangladesh
 Nurul Islam (physician) (1928–2013), Bangladeshi physician and National Professor of Bangladesh
 Nurul Islam (Dhubri politician) (born 1931), Indian politician
 Nurul Islam (minister) (born 1938), Bangladesh Minister of Expatriates' Welfare and Overseas Employment (2015–2018)
 A M Nurul Islam (1939–2017), Bangladeshi politician and bureaucrat
 Muhammad Nurul Islam (born 1943), Bangladeshi diplomat
 Nurul Islam Nahid (born 1945), Bangladeshi politician and the Minister of Education (2015–2018)
 Md. Nurul Islam Sujon, Bangladeshi politician and the Minister of Railways (since 2019)
 Nurulislam Arkallayev (born 1961), Ukrainian politician
 Haji Nurul Islam (born 1963), Indian politician
 Nurul Islam Farooqi (died 2014), Bangladeshi Islamic scholar
 Nurul Islam (economist), Bangladeshi economist and academic
 Nurul Islam Babul (1946–2020), Bangladeshi businessman
 Nurul Islam (lawyer), British (ex-Burmese) lawyer and political activist

See also
Nurul Islam Mosque, Cape Town, South Africa
Noorul Islam University, Tamil Nadu, India